Ajugoideae is subfamily of the family Lamiaceae. The subfamily name of Teucrioideae is a synonym of Ajugoideae.

Genera
 Tribe Ajugeae
 Acrymia Prain
 Ajuga L.
 Cymaria Benth.
 Garrettia H. R. Fletcher
 Holocheila
 All others
 Aegiphila Jacq.
 Amasonia L.f.
 Amethystea L.
 Caryopteris Bunge
 Clerodendrum L.
 Discretitheca P. D. Cantino
 Faradaya F. Muell.
 Glossocarya Wall. ex Griff.
 Hosea Ridl.
 Kalaharia Baill.
 Karomia Dop.
 Monochilus Fisch. & C. A. Mey.
 Oncinocalyx F. Muell.
 Ovieda L.
 Oxera Labill.
 Pseudocaryopteris (Briq.) P. D. Cantino
 Rotheca Raf.
 Rubiteucris Kudô
 Schnabelia Hand.-Mazz.
 Spartothamnella Briq.
 Tetraclea A. Gray
 Teucridium Hook. f.
 Teucrium L.
 Trichostema L.
 Tripora P. D. Cantino
 Volkameria L.
Sources: UniProt, GRIN

References

Lamiaceae
Asterid subfamilies